Stunts, Blunts & Hip Hop is the debut album from hip hop Producer-Rapper Diamond D, released on September 22, 1992. The album features some of the earliest appearances from Diamond's later D.I.T.C. partners Big L and Fat Joe da Gangsta, as well as his crew the Psychotic Neurotics. Although Diamond D handles the majority of the album's production, other popular beat makers such as Large Professor, Q-Tip, Jazzy Jay, Showbiz and The 45 King co-produce on several tracks. The album features the singles "Best-Kept Secret" and "Sally Got a One-Track Mind." The album was not released on vinyl; however, there were promotional copies pressed with full artwork which were highly sought-after. The vinyl edition was eventually made available as a reissue years later. The original promo version has a sticker on it; the reissue had this sticker scanned into the artwork.

In 1998, the album was selected as one of The Source's 100 Best Rap Albums.

Track listing

Samples credits
"Best Kept Secret" samples "I Can Hear You Calling" by Three Dog Night and "N.T" by Kool & the Gang.
"Sally Got a One Track Mind" samples "It's a New Day" by Skull Snaps and "Sparkling in the Sand" by Tower of Power.
"Step to Me" samples "Sam Enchanted Dick" and "Born to Be Blue" by Jack Bruce and "Fight Back" by Solomon Burke.
"F*ck What You Heard" samples "Magnificent Sanctuary Band" by Donny Hathaway, "Alvina" by John Handy and "Show Business" by A Tribe Called Quest.
"I'm Outta Here" samples "Gotta Get Away" by The Flambing Ember.
"A Day in the Life" samples "Virginia's Pretty Funky" by Watsonian Institute.
"I Went for Mine" samples "Faded Lady" by SSO.
"Check One, Two" samples "Stop" by Mike Bloomfield, Al Cooper and Stephen Stills and "Gets Into His Move" by Stezo.
"What You Seek" samples "You Can Make It If You Try" by Sly & the Family Stone.
"Confused" samples "Intimate Connection" by Kleeer.
"Pass Dat Shit" samples "Keeping Me Out of the Storm" by Rare Earth and "Pride and Vanity" by Ohio Players.
"Freestyle (Yo, That's That Shit!)" samples "Footin' It" by George Benson.
"K.I.S.S (Keep It Simple, Stupid)" samples "American Tango" by Weather Report and "Hey Jude" by Clarence Wheeler and The Enforcers.
"Stunts, Blunts & Hip Hop" samples "Almustafa the Beloved" by Billy Cobham.
"Feel the Vibe" samples "Bad Tune" by Earth, Wind & Fire.

Album singles

Charts

Singles chart positions

References

External links
 

1992 debut albums
Diamond D albums
Mercury Records albums
Albums produced by Large Professor
Albums produced by Q-Tip (musician)
Albums produced by Diamond D
Albums produced by Showbiz (producer)
Albums produced by the 45 King